Zoë Skoulding is a poet, living in Wales, whose work encompasses translation, editing, sound-based vocal performance, literary criticism and teaching creative writing. Her poetry has been widely anthologised, translated into over 25 languages and presented at numerous international festivals.

Career
Skoulding is Professor of Poetry and Creative Writing at Bangor University, where her research explores urban space, sound, ecopoetics, contemporary experimental poetry and translation. She has been involved in several collaborative poetry translation projects, including Metropoetica,  and has translated from French the selected poems of Luxembourg poet Jean Portante.

In 2018 she received a Cholmondeley Award from the  Society of Authors for the achievement and distinction of her body of work and her contribution to poetry. Her collection Footnotes to Water won the poetry category in the Wales Book of the Year awards, 2020.

As Editor of Poetry Wales from 2008 to 2014, she maintained the magazine's international focus and broadened its scope to include more experimental forms of poetry.

Her musical collaborations include the psychogeographical collective Parking Non-Stop and sound art/poetry performances with Alan Holmes.

In the 1990s, Skoulding wrote lyrics for the Welsh musicians Rheinallt H Rowlands and David Wrench, with whom she also played bass. She recorded and performed with the "anglo-welsh kosmische supergroup" The Serpents.

Personal life
Zoë Skoulding was born in Bradford, United Kingdom in 1967. Having lived in East Anglia, India and Belgium, she now resides in North Wales with her musician husband, Alan Holmes.

Bibliography

Poetry collections
1998 Tide Table
2004 The Mirror Trade
2007 Dark Wires (with Ian Davidson)
2008 From Here (with Simonetta Moro)
2008 Remains of a Future City
2013 The Museum of Disappearing Sounds
2016 Teint: For the Bièvre
2018 Las habitaciones y otros poemas [Translators: Katherine Hedeen and Victor Rodríguez Núñez]  
2019 Footnotes to Water
2020 A Revolutionary Calendar 
2022 A Marginal Sea

Other publications
2009 You Will Live in Your Own Cathedral (trilingual (En/Cz/D) booklet and audio CD with Alan Holmes, Richard Hopewell, Huw Jones, Monika Rinck, Eva Klimentova, Alexandra Buchler)
2008 Crwydro / Marcheurs Des Bois: A Wales Quebec Ambulation (with Daniel Poulin and Simon Whitehead)
2013 Metropoetica – Poetry and urban space: women writing cities (with Ingmāra Balode, Julia Fiedorczuk, Sanna Karlström, Ana Pepelnik, Sigurbjörg Þrastardóttir, Elżbieta Wójcik-Leese)
2013 Placing Poetry (edited with Ian Davidson)

Poems in anthologies
2008 Women's Work: Modern Women Poets Writing in English (ed. Amy Wack and Eva Salzman, Seren)
2010 Identity Parade (ed. Roddy Lumsden, Bloodaxe)
2010 Infinite Difference: Other Poetries by UK Women Poets (ed. Carrie Etter, Shearsman)
2011 The Ground Aslant: Radical Landscape Poetry (ed. Harriet Tarlo, Shearsman)
2012 Best British Poetry 2012 (ed. Sasha Dugdale, Salt)
2015 Out of Everywhere 2: Linguistically innovative poetry by women in the USA and UK (ed. Emily Critchley, Reality Street)
2021 Poetry and Covid-19 (ed. Anthony Caleshu and Rory Waterman, Shearsman)
2021 Last Kind Words (ed. Peter Riley, Shearsman)

Monographs
2013 Contemporary Women’s Poetry and Urban Space: Experimental Cities (Palgrave Macmillan).
2020 Poetry and listening: the noise of lyric (Liverpool University Press 2020)

Discography
1996 Rheinallt H Rowlands – Bukowski
1997 David Wrench – Black Roses
1997 David Wrench – Blow Winds Blow
1997 David Wrench – The Ballad of the Christmas Tree and the Silver Birch
1998 The Serpents – No Mask, No Cloak, Dim Gobaith
1999 The Serpents – You Have Just Been Poisoned by the Serpents
2001 Various artists – Infrasonic Waves
2006 Faust – Faust... in Autumn
2007 Various artists – Klangbad Festival 2007
2008 Parking Non-Stop - Species Corridor
2009 Zoë Skoulding - You Will Live in Your Own Cathedral
2010 Parking Non-Stop - Cold Star

Selected International Performances
2008 Medana Festival, Slovenia
2008 Nødutgang Festival, Bodø, Norway
2009 Ars Poetica, Bratislava
2009 Vilenica Festival, Slovenia (with Metropoetica)
2009 Berlin Poesiefestival
2009 AWEN International Festival of Poetry and Film, ATRiuM, Cardiff
2010 Readings/performances in Pondicherry, Chennai, Pune and Trivandrum as part of Poetry Connections with Literature Across Frontiers in association with the British Council 
2010 Riga Poetry Evenings, Latvia (with Metropoetica)
2010 Lyd+Litteratur Aarhus, Denmark
2010 Printemps de Poètes, Luxembourg
2010 The Other Room Series, Manchester
2010 Granada International Festival of Poetry, Nicaragua
2011 Café Fra, Prague
2011 Wroclaw Port Festival, Poland (with Metropoetica)
2011 Dasein Café, Athens
2011 Ledbury Festival (with Poetry Connections)
2011 World Festival of Poetry, Venezuela
2011 Struga Poetry Evenings, Macedonia
2011 Novi Sad Literature Festival, Serbia
2011 Control Club, Bucharest (with Parking Non-Stop)
2011 Bodø Festival, Norway (with Parking Non-Stop)
2012 Ars Cameralis, Katowice
2012 Poets Live, Paris
2012 Dinefwr Festival
2012 Fiction Fiesta, Cardiff
2013 Stanza Festival, St Andrews
2013 Prague Bookworld
2013 Reading Poetry Festival
2013 Avant-Garde Festival, Schiphorst
2015 Izmir Poetry Festival, Turkey
2016 Managua Poetry Festival, Nicaragua
2016 Bursa Poetry Festival, Turkey
2017 Guayaquil International Poetry Festival, Ecuador
2017 Inizjamed Malta Mediterranean Literature Festival 
2017 Luna de Locos Pereira International Poetry Festival, Colombia
2018 Safi Poetry Forum, Morocco
2018 University of California, Berkeley, USA 
2018 International Poetry Festival of Costa Rica 
2018 Ars Poetica, Slovakia 
2019 Medellín International Poetry Festival, Colombia 
2019 Double Change, Paris, France
2019 Festival Internacional de Poesía de Santiago de Chile 
2022 Festival international de la Poésie de Trois Rivières, Québec 
2022 Oroboro, Montréal, Québec

References

External links

Zoë Skoulding Bangor University staff page 
Parking Non-Stop official website
Poems online
Zoe Skoulding poems, Blackbox Manifold 8
SHEARSMAN BOOKS
: zoe skoulding :
PN Review Print and Online Poetry Magazine - The Man in the Moone - Zoë Skoulding - PN Review 203

1967 births
Living people
Welsh women poets
Welsh poets
Welsh musicians
English experimental musicians
English women poets